"Come a Little Closer" is a song co-written and recorded by American country music artist Dierks Bentley.  It was released in July 2005 as the second single from his 2005 album Modern Day Drifter.  The song went to number one on the U.S. Country chart and held that position for the chart weeks of December 3 and December 10, 2005. On the chart for December 17, the song fell to number two when Joe Nichols' "Tequila Makes Her Clothes Fall Off" replaced it at the top spot. The song then returned to number 1 for a third and final week on the chart dated December 24.  The song was written by Bentley and Brett Beavers.

Critical reception
Deborah Evans Price, of Billboard magazine reviewed the song favorably, saying that Bentley "shows he has a way with a ballad on this sultry number. The sensual tone and sexy lyric hark back to those envelope-pushing Conway Twitty hits that once raised eyebrows. She goes on to compare the song to Twitty's, "I'd Love to Lay You Down." On Bentley's vocals she says that he "brings warmth to a decidedly sensual lyric." Kevin John Coyne, reviewing the song for Country Universe, gave it a negative rating. He said that Bentley doesn't quite have the vocal maturity to pull this song off but he is getting there.

Music video
The music video was directed by David McClister and was filmed in Nashville in a warehouse. Dierks Bentley's love interest was played by Bonnie-Jill Laflin.

Chart positions
"Come a Little Closer" debuted at number 49 on the U.S. Billboard Hot Country Songs for the week of July 30, 2005.

Year-end charts

Certifications

References

2005 songs
Country ballads
2000s ballads
Dierks Bentley songs
2005 singles
Songs written by Dierks Bentley
Songs written by Brett Beavers
Capitol Records Nashville singles
Song recordings produced by Brett Beavers